The Maker's Mark Mile Stakes is a Grade I American Thoroughbred horse race for horses age four years old and older over a distance of one mile on the turf held annually in early April at Keeneland Race Course, Lexington, Kentucky during the spring meeting.

History

The event was inaugurated as the Fort Harrod Stakes on 13 April 1989 and was run over distance of about  miles the won by the seven year old Yankee Affair who set a course record in winning the event in a time of 1:43. The following year the event was decreased to the current distance of one mile.

The Fort Harrod Stakes was named after the fort which was named after James Harrod, who led an early party of settlers into Kentucky in the 1770s.

In 1997 the Maker's Mark distillery located not far from Lexington, began their sponsorship of the event and Keeneland's administration renamed the event to the Maker's Mark Mile Stakes. In 2010 the event was once again renamed to a bourbon distilled by Maker's Mark – Maker's 46 Mile Stakes.

The event was classified a Grade III in 1991 and was upgraded to Grade II race in 2000.  In 2008 the event reached as a Grade I status confirming the quality that had competed in previous years and continues to attract.

Several class horses who have won this event in the spring have continued to prove their dominance. The 1991 winner, Opening Verse continued on to win the Breeders' Cup Mile that year. Several others including Artie Schiller in 2005, 2006 US Champion Male Turf Horse Miesque's Approval and Kip Deville in 2007 have also performed this feat. Twice American Horse of the Year (2012, 2013) Wise Dan also won Breeders' Cup Mile in 2013 and also captured this event the following year for the second time.

Miss Temple City is the only mare to have won this event in 2016.

Records 

Speed  record
 1:33.54 – Perfect Soul (2004)

Margins
  lengths – Get Stormy (2011)

Most wins
 2 – Wise Dan (2013, 2014)
 2 – Kip Deville (2007, 2008)

Most wins by a jockey
 3 – Jerry Bailey (1991, 1993, 1996)
 3 – Edgar Prado (2004, 2005, 2007)
 3 – Javier Castellano (2011, 2015, 2017)

Most wins by an owner
 2 – Allen E. Paulson (1991, 1993)
 2 – Gainsborough Farm (1999, 2002)
 2 – IEAH Stables, Pegasus Holding Group Stables, J. Roberts & A. & S. Cohen (2007, 2008)
 2 – Morton Fink (2013, 2014)
 2 – Gary Barber (2018, 2020)
 2 – Charles E. Fipke (2004, 2022)

Most wins by a trainer
 3 – Roger L. Attfield (1992, 2004, 2022)

Winners

Notes:

† Filly or Mare

See also 
 List of American and Canadian Graded races

References

Graded stakes races in the United States
Grade 1 stakes races in the United States
Grade 1 turf stakes races in the United States
Open mile category horse races
Keeneland horse races
Recurring sporting events established in 1989
1989 establishments in Kentucky